Schoenolirion wrightii, known as Texas sunnybell, is a species of flowering plant in the Agave subfamily. It is native to the southern United States, in Texas, Louisiana, Arkansas, and Alabama. The ovate to lanceolate tepals are white with a green stripe on the back, mostly three-veined, but sometimes five-veined. Schoenolirion wrightii flowers between March and May, occurring in sandstone outcrops, wet pinelands, and boggy places.

References

Agavoideae
Flora of the Southeastern United States
Plants described in 1979
Flora without expected TNC conservation status